Carl Johan Petter Hansson (born 14 December 1976) is a Swedish former professional footballer who played as a defender. He most notably represented Halmstads BK, SC Heerenveen, Rennes, and Monaco during a career that spanned between 1994 and 2012. A full international between 2001 and 2009, he won 43 caps for the Sweden national team and represented his country at the 2004 and 2008 UEFA European Championships as well as the 2006 FIFA World Cup.

Club career

Early career 
Hansson started his career at Söderhamns FF and was transferred to Halmstads BK in 1998. He made his Allsvenskan debut on 4 October 1998 against AIK. Petter Hansson became a popular player at Halmstads BK, mainly because his fighting spirit and a strong will to win a match. Hansson played as a defensive midfielder and as a central defender and became a key player for the club. This resulted in a growing popularity among fans and he became the team's captain. While at Halmstads BK he helped them win the fourth championship in their history in 2000.

SC Heerenveen 
In 2002, he moved to the Netherlands to play at Eredivisie side SC Heerenveen. At Heerenveen he developed as a more consistent player and became a fan's favourite again. Heerenveen supporters voted him to be SC Heerenveen's best player of the season several times.

Rennes 
On 1 May 2007, he signed a contract at Stade Rennais, playing in Ligue 1. On 15 May 2010, Hansson announced that he would be leaving the club when his contract expired at the end of the season.

Monaco 
On 4 June 2010, he signed a contract with the Ligue 1 club AS Monaco FC. On 30 May 2012, Hansson officially announced, through his agent Fabrice Picot, his retirement as a player.

International career 
Hansson earned his first cap for the Sweden national team in 2001, in a match against Finland. He was part of their squad during Euro 2004 and the 2006 World Cup. On 2 June 2007, in the rivalry match against Denmark, he scored his first goal for the national team. During qualification for Euro 2008, he was partnered with Olof Mellberg. On 10 June 2008, at the Euro 2008, he scored his second goal for the national team in the opening match of their campaign, a 2–0 defeat of Greece.

After losing away against Denmark on 10 October 2009, it was obvious that Sweden had failed to qualify 2010 FIFA World Cup in South Africa the following year. Due to this, Hansson along with several other players decided to end their international careers after the final qualifying match against Albania, which Sweden won 4–1. In October 2010, Hansson made a brief comeback to the national team due to defender Mellberg's suspension in Sweden's UEFA Euro 2012 qualifier away against the Netherlands on 12 October. Hansson was an un-used substitute. Sweden was defeated 4–1.

Career statistics

International 

Scores and results list Sweden's goal tally first, score column indicates score after each Hansson goal.

Honours
Halmstads BK
Allsvenskan: 2000

Individual
 Stor Grabb: 2007

References

External links
 Stade Rennais Online profile
 Elite Prospects profile

1976 births
Living people
Association football defenders
Swedish footballers
Sweden international footballers
UEFA Euro 2004 players
2006 FIFA World Cup players
UEFA Euro 2008 players
Allsvenskan players
Eredivisie players
Ligue 1 players
Ligue 2 players
Halmstads BK players
SC Heerenveen players
Stade Rennais F.C. players
AS Monaco FC players
Swedish expatriate footballers
Swedish expatriate sportspeople in the Netherlands
Expatriate footballers in the Netherlands
Swedish expatriate sportspeople in France
Expatriate footballers in France
Swedish expatriate sportspeople in Monaco
Expatriate footballers in Monaco